Henry Jervis Friese Miller (September 10, 1890 – January 7, 1949) served as a general in the United States Army Air Forces during World War II.

While serving in the European theater, Miller made publicly recorded comments about the top secret date of the Allied invasion of Normandy in May 1944. After Supreme Allied Commander Dwight D. Eisenhower found out, Miller was demoted to lieutenant colonel and sent back to the United States.

Early life

Miller was born on September 10, 1890, in Alloway Township, New Jersey, to John and Mary Miller. After attending local public schools, he was accepted to the United States Military Academy and graduated with the class of 1915.

Military career
After graduation, Miller was assigned as a second lieutenant in the United States Cavalry and served near El Paso, Texas, during the Pancho Villa Expedition of 1916. He was promoted to captain in 1917 and then major in 1918.

In 1917, Miller transferred to the Aviation Section, U.S. Signal Corps and completed primary flight training at Rockwell Field. He served with the American Expeditionary Forces in England from September to December 1918 during the last months of World War I.

In 1919, Miller returned to the United States. Between October 8–31, he participated in the Army Transcontinental Air Race, organized by the United States Army Air Service. Seven airman were killed, two en route to the race.

In the interwar period, Miller served many assignments in the United States Army Air Service and then the United States Army Air Corps. When he became commanding officer of Duncan Field Air Depot, he was promoted to brigadier general in the Army Air Corps on 10 July 1941. Training and logistics units had kept the older name while all other units had been redesignated as the United States Army Air Forces on June 20, 1941.

He was promoted to major general on February 27, 1942 when he became the chief of the 9th Air Force Air Service Command, based out of Wright Field near Dayton, Ohio.

D-Day incident
In 1944, while attending a dinner party at Claridge's in London, Miller leaked the date of the upcoming Operation Overlord during a conversation with a fellow officer, saying that "the invasion will come before June 15." An Associated Press account gives his comment as "On my honor the invasion will take place before June 15." When news of this security breach reached Supreme Allied Commander General Eisenhower in May 1944, Miller was demoted to his permanent rank of lieutenant colonel and sent home.

Retirement
On November 30, 1944, Miller retired from service due to physical disability, and in December 1948 was promoted to brigadier general on the retired list. The United Press reported on December 3, 1944 that he had taken an advisory job with a war plant.

Death
Miller moved to San Antonio, Texas, in the spring of 1948 and lived there until his death on January 7, 1949. He was buried in the Fort Sam Houston National Cemetery, alongside his wife Vera Abigail, who had died on January 11, 1943.

Awards
Mexican Service Medal
Victory Medal
American Defense Service Medal
American Campaign Medal
European-African-Middle Eastern Campaign Medal
World War II Victory Medal

See also
 Ike: Countdown to D-Day, a 2004 made-for-TV movie which dramatized Miller's intelligence breach
 D-Day the Sixth of June, a 1956 movie in which the fictional Lieutenant Colonel Alexander Timmer is sent back to the US for a similar breach of security to Miller's

References

External links

1890 births
1949 deaths
United States Army Air Forces generals
United States Army personnel of World War II
United States Military Academy alumni
Graduates of the United States Military Academy Class of 1915
Military personnel from New Jersey
People from Salem County, New Jersey
United States Army Air Forces generals of World War II
United States Army personnel of World War I
Burials at Fort Sam Houston National Cemetery